RISAT-2B, or Radar Imaging Satellite-2B is an Indian radar reconnaissance satellite that is part of India's RISAT programme and the third satellite in the series. It is built by Indian Space Research Organisation (ISRO) to replace RISAT-2.

Overview 
RISAT-2B satellites will succeed India's ten-year-old RISAT-2 spacecraft. Equipped with X-band radar imagers, RISAT-2B monitors the Earth day and night, in any weather conditions. RISAT uses a technique called Synthetic Aperture Radar (SAR) to build images of the Earth below it. Signals transmitted from the satellite are reflected from the surface and its echo is recorded when it reaches back to the satellite. These signals can then be processed to build a profile of the ground below. The RISAT constellation is operated by the ISRO. While ISRO states the satellites applications as supporting agriculture, forestry and disaster management, their primary purpose is military surveillance.

RISAT-2B can operate in different modes including Very High Resolution Radar (VHRR) imaging modes of 1 × 0.5 m resolution and 0.5 × 0.3 m resolution. It is placed in an inclined orbit for better revisit rates over area of interest. Being a radar imaging satellite, RISAT-2B can image during day or night and in all weather conditions.

Satellite description 
RISAT-2B's main sensor is an indigenously developed synthetic-aperture radar (SAR) imaging satellite operating in X-band with 3.6 m radial rib antenna.

Launch 
It was successfully launched aboard a Polar Satellite Launch Vehicle (PSLV-C46) launch vehicle at 00:00 UTC on 22 May 2019 from the First Launch Pad at the Satish Dhawan Space Centre.

See also 

 List of Indian satellites

References 

Spacecraft launched by India in 2019
Earth observation satellites of India
Space synthetic aperture radar
Spacecraft launched by PSLV rockets
May 2019 events in India